The 2014 Women's U22 South American Volleyball Championship was the 1st edition of the tournament, organised by South America's governing volleyball body, the Confederación Sudamericana de Voleibol (CSV). The championship took place 20–24 August in Popayán, Colombia. The event served as a rating for the 2015 FIVB Women's U23 Volleyball World Championship.

Competing nations

Competition format
The 2014 Women's U22 South American Volleyball Championship consisted of a single round-robin pool between the six teams, the champion was determined from the ranking after the round.

Competition

All times are Colombia Standard Time (UTC-5)

 

|}

 

 

 

 

 

|}

Final standing

All-Star Team

Most Valuable Player

Best Setter

Best Opposite

Best Outside Hitters

 

Best Middle Blockers

Best Libero

External links
CSV official website

Women's South American Volleyball Championships
S
Volleyball
International volleyball competitions hosted by Colombia